FC Seoul is a South Korean professional football club based in Seoul, South Korea, who currently play in the K League Classic. FC Seoul's first participation in Asian competition was during the 1986 season, when they competed in the Asian Club Championship, their first match was against Hap Kuan of Macau, but FC Seoul withdrew. FC Seoul's next participation in Asian competition was 1999–2000 Asian Cup Winners' Cup and actual first match was Shimizu S-Pulse of Japan.

FC Seoul haven't won the Asia Champions League not yet, only have runners-up one time. Their most recent participation in the competition was in 2011.

Matches

AFC Competitions

1980s

2000s

2010s

Friendly Competitions

1980s

1990s

2000s

2010s

Statistics

AFC Champions League record

Club

By competition

AFC competition

By season

By nation

Players

Appearance Leaders Top 5

Goal Leaders Top 5

Clean Sheets Leaders Top 5

Awards

Club

Most Organized Club

AFC Champions League Fair Play Award

Individual

AFC Coach of the Year

AFC Champions League Dream Team

See also 
 FC Seoul records and statistics
 South Korean clubs in the Asian Club Championship
 South Korean clubs in the AFC Champions League

References

 Schedule & Results at AFC.com 
 King's Cup Results at RSSSF
 Lunar New Year Cup Results at RSSSF

External links
 AFC Champions League Official Page at AFC.com

FC Seoul
Seoul